Vittorio Spreti (1887–1950) was an Italian historian of the nobility of Italy. He came from an ancient noble family of Ravenna, in the Marche, and was a marquess. His Enciclopedia storico-nobiliare italiana was published in eight volumes between 1928 and 1936.

Publications 
Enciclopedia storico-nobiliare italiana: famiglie nobile e titolate viventi riconosciute del R. Governo d'Italia, compresi: città, comunità, mense vescovile, abazie, parrocchie ed enti nobili e titolati riconosciuti. Milano: Ed. Enciclopedia Storico-Nobiliare Italiana, 1928–36.

References

1887 births
1950 deaths
20th-century Italian historians
People from the Province of Macerata